Barnabas Enjoy (born 10 May 1980 in the Cook Islands) is a footballer who plays as a defender. He currently plays for Takuvaine in the Cook Islands Round Cup and the Cook Islands national football team.

References

1980 births
Living people
Cook Islands international footballers
Association football defenders
Cook Island footballers
2000 OFC Nations Cup players